The 2013–14 Macedonian Football Cup was the 22nd season of Macedonia's football knockout competition. Teteks are the defending champions, having won their first title. The 2013–14 champions were FK Rabotnichki who won their third title.

Competition calendar

First round
Matches were played on 21 and 22 August 2013.

|colspan="3" style="background-color:#97DEFF" align=center|21 August 2013

|-
|colspan="3" style="background-color:#97DEFF" align=center|22 August 2013

|}

Second round
Entering this round are the 16 winners from the First Round. The first legs took place on 18 September and the second legs took place on 25 September 2013.

|}

Quarter-finals
Entering this round are the 8 winners from the Second Round. The first legs took place on 12 and 13 October and the second legs took place on 20 November 2013.

|}

Semi-finals
Entering this round are the 4 winners from the Quarter-finals. The first legs were played on 19 March and the second legs were played on 16 April 2014.

Summary

|}

Matches

3–3 on aggregate. Rabotnichki won 5–4 in penalty shootout.

Metalurg won 1–0 on aggregate.

Final

See also
2013–14 Macedonian First Football League
2013–14 Macedonian Second Football League
2013–14 Macedonian Third Football League

References

External links
 Official Website

Macedonia
Cup
Macedonian Football Cup seasons